Frederick Yamoah Opoku (born 19 September 1997) is a Ghanaian professional footballer who plays as a winger.

Opoku started his career playing for Inter Allies in Ghana. In 2017, he moved to the United States of America to join New England Revolution in Boston for trails, he spent three weeks with them before joining Harrisburg City Islanders in Pennsylvania that same year on loan from Inter Allies. At Harrisburg City Islanders, Opoku played over 15 matches. He moved on loan the next season to Penn FC where he got noticed by Per Rud, the sporting director of HB Køge in Denmark where he played before moving to Albania.

Early life
Born in Osu, Accra to Augustina Akua Mensah and Benard Opoku, Opoku attended Royal Technical College at Nungua where he studied Electronics and Telecommunication. He began his football career at a very young age, playing in the streets of Accra with his friends. He got discovered by the then coach of Obonu FC in Labadi, Mr Paul Bentil Johnson and got the chance of playing for his team. He later moved to Kindoko FC, the youth side of Tudu Mighty Jets FC and from there he then moved to Accra Youth FC and was promoted to the senior side; Inter Allies.

Club career

Inter Allies
Opoku began his career in Ghana as part of the Accra Youth FC program before being called up to join the senior side during the first round of games in the 2013–14 season. He made his debut for the club later that season, and then appeared in all 30 of the team's games in the 2014–15 season.
At a younger age, Opoku had the talent for playing football. He began playing football as a hobby in the streets of Osu with his friends before beginning his professional career at Inter Allies. 
He first played at the junior side where he developed and played as a winger and later got promoted from Inter Allies' youth team; Accra Youth FC due to his exceptional abilities.

Penn FC

2017–18: Loan move from Inter Allies to Harrisburg City Islanders

On the 6th day of May 2017, Inter Allies announced that their forward Fredrick Yamoah Opoku had joined the United Soccer League side Penn FC formerly the Harrisburg City Islanders in the United States of America. The winger signed a loan deal with the USL side for the 2017 USL season.

HB Køge
Frederick Opoku completed his move to Danish lower-tier side HB Køge early last year. He joined the Blue and Black lads on a three-year contract after playing 15 matches halfway through the 2018 United Soccer League season with Penn FC in the United States of America. Last season, Yamoah had a season long loan stint with the same side Penn FC where he played 15 matches.

Opoku got off to a flying start in Denmark as he helped HB Køge register a 3-0 winners over Silkeborg IF at the JYSK Park in Silkeborg on his debut. 
Fredrick Opoku Yamoah also scored on his cup debut for HB Køge in their heavy away win in the Danish Cup. The Royal Blues defeated Humlebæk 4–1 at the Humlebæk Stadion in Humlebæk to progress comfortably to the next stage of the DBU Pokalen. The pacy Ghanaian winger who joined from USL side Penn FC played until a quarter of an hour left where he was substituted by Liam Jordan. Jacob Johansson scored first for the away side in the 11th minute before Aleksander Sepp doubled the lead just 9 minutes before the break. Magnus Hauser made it 3 just four minutes after recess and Opoku ended it with a 4th goal putting the icing on the cake in the 67th minute.

He is currently wearing number 7 jersey and has his last name OPOKU printed at the back of his jersey.

On 1 September 2019 HB Køge confirmed, that Opoku had left the club by mutual agreement.

International career

2016–17: Youth level and early international career 
Opoku has also seen international action, competing for the Ghana National U20 Team in African Youth Championship qualifiers in 2016.

.

References

1997 births
Living people
Association football wingers
Ghanaian footballers
International Allies F.C. players
Penn FC players
HB Køge players
KF Bylis Ballsh players
Ghana Premier League players
USL Championship players
Danish 1st Division players
Ghanaian expatriate footballers
Ghanaian expatriate sportspeople in the United States
Expatriate soccer players in the United States
Ghanaian expatriate sportspeople in Denmark
Expatriate men's footballers in Denmark
Kategoria Superiore players
Expatriate footballers in Albania
Ghanaian expatriate sportspeople in Albania
Footballers from Accra